William Winter Jefferson (April 6, 1876  February 11, 1946) was an actor in silent films.

Early life 
Jefferson was born in London to Sarah and Joseph Jefferson, an actor. He initially studied in Germany to become a medical doctor, but decided to pursue an acting career like his father, instead. He was elected to The Lambs in 1896.

Career 

Jefferson starred in the 1913 film Wanted by the Police, for which he earned positive reviews. He was one of the leads in the Keystone comedy Bright Lights.

Personal life 
He was married to actress Christie MacDonald, then to actress Vivian Martin in 1913. After retiring from acting, he moved to Honolulu, Hawaii, in 1928. He married his wife Mary in Honolulu in 1936.

Death 
Jefferson died in Honolulu on February 11, 1946.

Filmography
Wanted by the Police (1913)
Camille (1915)
He Did and He Didn't (1916) as schoolmate
The Habit of Happiness (1916) as Jones
The Stronger Love (1916)
The Right Direction (1916)
The Other Man (1916)
His Wife's Mistakes (1916)
Bright Lights (1916)
A Dash of Courage (1916)
Her Own People (1917) as Blinn Agnew
Out of the Wreck (1917)
Marrying Money
The Bright Lights (film)

References

External links

1876 births
1946 deaths
20th-century American male actors
American male silent film actors
Members of The Lambs Club
British expatriates in Germany
British emigrants to the United States